Arctic Drift is a Dirk Pitt novel, the 20th of the series and was released on November 25, 2008.

Plot
The plot begins in the year 1847, when the Franklin Expedition becomes stranded trying to find the Northwest Passage. They experience a harsh winter. The men are seemingly going mad. Their stranded ships (Erebus and Terror) are loaded with a mysterious, unidentified silvery metal. The story switches to the present day. There is an ongoing quest to save the earth from Global Warming. All of the world's scientists are looking for a solution. Some people are trying to thwart these efforts. The NUMA team, headed by Dirk Pitt, Al Giordino and Dirk Pitt's children, Dirk Junior and Summer, are trying to find a way to stop Global Warming. Their quest leads them to investigate a series of mysterious asphyxiations. They soon realize that the solution they are looking for is hidden in the heart of the Arctic; in an old forgotten ship. They will need to solve a centuries-old mystery to save the earth.

Release Details

2008, United States, Michael Joseph LTD, December 2008, Hardcover
2008, United States, G. P. Putnam's Sons, First Edition, December 2008, Hardcover.
2008, United States, Norwood Press, Limited Edition, December 2008, Hardcover.

References

Dirk Pitt novels
2008 American novels

Novels set in the Arctic
Fiction set in 1847
G. P. Putnam's Sons books
Collaborative novels